Thaleropia is a genus of flowering plants in the family Myrtaceae first described as a genus in 1993. It is native to Queensland and Papuasia.

It includes three known species formally classified in the genus Metrosideros:
 Thaleropia hypargyrea (Diels) Peter G.Wilson - New Guinea, Solomon Islands, Santa Cruz Islands 
 Thaleropia iteophylla (Diels) Peter G.Wilson - New Guinea  
 Thaleropia queenslandica (L.S.Sm.) Peter G. Wilson - Queensland

References

Myrtaceae genera
Myrtaceae
Australasian realm flora